Margarites calliostomoides is a species of sea snail, a marine gastropod mollusk in the family Margaritidae.

Description
The height of the shell attains 14 mm.

Distribution
This marine species occurs off the Kurile Islands, Russia.

References

 Kantor Yu.I. & Sysoev A.V. (2006) Marine and brackish water Gastropoda of Russia and adjacent countries: an illustrated catalogue. Moscow: KMK Scientific Press. 372 pp. + 140 pls. page(s): 32

calliostomoides
Gastropods described in 2000